Flexopecten glaber is a species of saltwater clam, a scallop, a marine bivalve mollusks in the family Pectinidae, the scallops.

Subspecies
Subspecies of this species recognized by WoRMS include:
 Flexopecten glaber ponticus (Bucquoy, Dautzenberg & Dollfus, 1889), from the Black Sea

Synonyms:
 Flexopecten glaber glaber (Linnaeus, 1758) = Flexopecten glaber (Linnaeus, 1758)
 Flexopecten glaber proteus (Dillwyn, 1817) = Flexopecten glaber (Linnaeus, 1758)
 Flexopecten proteus (Dillwyn, 1817) = Flexopecten glaber (Linnaeus, 1758)

References

 WoRMS info on the species
 Images of shells of the species

Pectinidae
Molluscs described in 1758
Taxa named by Carl Linnaeus
Molluscs of the Mediterranean Sea
Molluscs of the Black Sea
Marine molluscs of Europe
Bivalves of Europe
Marine molluscs of Africa
Marine molluscs of Asia
Bivalves of Asia